Albert Street, London NW1, is a street in Camden Town in the London Borough of Camden, England, near Camden Town station. It includes several listed Grade II listed 19th-century buildings. Some of the houses have had notable former residents and two of them have blue plaques. Although the street is mainly residential, it also includes some offices, a pub, and a museum.

Location
The street leads, at its north-west end, to Parkway (the A2401 road) and, at the south-east end, to Delancey Street (the A503 road). The nearest station is Camden Town on London Underground's Northern line.

Listed buildings and notable residents

Even-numbered houses
The writer, journalist and   Labour MP Dick Leonard (1930–2021), his wife Irène Heidelberger-Leonard, Professor of German Literature, their son Mark Leonard (born 1974), political scientist and author, and their daughter Miriam Leonard (born 1976), Professor of Greek Literature, have all lived at No. 18.  Dick Leonard died there in 2021.

No. 20, known as Tudor Lodge, which has been listed Grade II by Historic England, was built in the 1840s as a house and studios for the artist Charles Lucy (1814–1873). The poet and novelist George MacDonald (1824–1905), who lived there from 1860 to 1863, described the house in his 1871 novel The Vicar's Daughter.  It now has a blue plaque, commemorating MacDonald, that was erected by English Heritage in 2005.

The Liverpool-born writer, theatre critic and artist Beryl Bainbridge (1932−2010) lived at No. 42 for 45 years. In 1967 she painted Napoleon Dancing at 42 Albert St, Camden Town, to the Strains of the Gramophone.

John Desmond Bernal (1901–1971), the Irish scientist who pioneered the use of X-ray crystallography in molecular biology, lived and died at No. 44. In 2001 English Heritage placed a blue plaque there to commemorate him.

The writer and broadcaster Robert Elms (born 1959) lives at No. 74.

Odd-numbered houses
A terrace of 27 houses (Nos. 45 to 97) was built in 1845 and is Grade II listed. The Yorkshire-born architect William Henry Crossland (1835–1908), who designed Rochdale Town Hall, Holloway Sanatorium and Royal Holloway College, died at No. 57 on 14 November 1908.  

A terrace of nine houses (Nos. 123 to 139) was built in about 1845 and is Grade II listed. Nos. 129 to 131 are now called Raymond Burton House, which is the location of Jewish Museum London.

No. 141, on the corner of Albert Street and Parkway, is a pub, The Spread Eagle. It is Grade II listed.

Other buildings
At the other end of the street, a Grade II-listed house, No. 38 Delancey Street, has an entrance on Albert Street.

Former mosque

London's first mosque was opened in 1895 at a house in Albert Street.

Albert Street North Residents’ Association
Albert Street North Residents’ Association represents the interests of local residents who live at the street's north end.

Gallery

References

Camden Town
Grade II listed buildings in the London Borough of Camden
Mosques in the United Kingdom
Streets in the London Borough of Camden